Shenandoah Valley Railroad refers to one of several railroads in the U.S. state of Virginia:
Shenandoah Valley Railroad (short-line), a current short line
Shenandoah Valley Railroad (1867–1890), predecessor of the Norfolk and Western Railway
Shenandoah Valley Railway (1890), short-lived successor to the above